The fighting game series Super Smash Bros. from Nintendo, launched in 1999, features an assortment of video game characters from different franchises. There are 89 playable characters across the series, mostly sourced from Nintendo franchises but with a number of third-party ones as well. There are also other non-player characters that take the form of enemies, bosses, and power-ups.

Playable characters
Each game in the series has a number of playable characters, referred to as "fighters", that are taken primarily from Nintendo franchises. There are 89 total fighters across the series. Starting with Super Smash Bros. Brawl, characters from non-Nintendo franchises began to make playable appearances, and starting in Super Smash Bros. for Nintendo 3DS and Wii U, certain characters received alternate costumes that would represent alternate gendered variants or different characters entirely. At the start of each game, some of the fighters will be locked from play. To unlock a hidden fighter, players need to clear certain conditions and defeat that fighter in a match.

In Super Smash Bros. for Nintendo 3DS and Wii U and Super Smash Bros. Ultimate, players can make their own Mii Fighters that can be customized with three different fighting styles (Brawler,  and Gunner) and costume pieces unlocked through gameplay or purchased as downloadable content. Several of these costumes are based on characters and franchises not otherwise represented, such as Sans from Undertale, Altaïr from Assassin's Creed, Cuphead from Cuphead, Vault Boy from Fallout, Travis Touchdown from No More Heroes, Dragonborn from The Elder Scrolls V: Skyrim, Dante from Devil May Cry, Shantae from Shantae, and Doom Slayer from Doom.

All games have featured fighters that largely share their moves and abilities with another fighter on the roster, but with minor differences in their presentation and gameplay. In Super Smash Bros. Melee, all of these characters, known as "model swap characters" according to the Japanese website, were unlockable, but were distinguished from other unlockable characters in that their portrait was added next to the character they were based on instead of filling in one of the placeholder slots at the bottom of the select screen. In Ultimate, several of these characters were officially labeled as "Echo Fighters". They have an option either to be displayed next to or within the character portrait from which they are based on.

Notes

Non-playable characters
In addition to the roster of playable fighters, several non-playable characters appear as summonable items via "Assist Trophies" or Poké Balls, background stage hazards, enemies, collectibles, or bosses in the single-player modes. While some were specifically created for use in the Super Smash Bros. series, most come from established game franchises like the playable characters.

Summonable
Certain items in the Super Smash Bros. series can be used to temporarily summon other characters into battle. The first of these, the Poké Ball, was introduced in the original Super Smash Bros. game. It can be thrown to temporarily call forth a random Pokémon, which will perform one of its signature abilities to attack opponents or affect the battle in other ways. Each Super Smash Bros. game has had a different set of Pokémon that can appear from Poké Balls, though some such as Snorlax and Goldeen have appeared in multiple entries.

Another item, the Assist Trophy, was added in Super Smash Bros. Brawl and functions similarly to the Poké Ball. Players who pick up an Assist Trophy will summon a random character from one of various gaming franchises, causing them to interfere with opponents. Available characters vary between games, and range from supporting members of already represented franchises, such as Super Mario Waluigi and Star Fox Andross, to less-known characters like the Sheriff, Dr. Kawashima from Brain Age, and Isaac from Golden Sun. Some Assist Trophies, including Little Mac, Dark Samus and Isabelle, have gone on to appear as playable fighters in later installments. There have also been Assist Trophies based on third-party characters, such as Bomberman and Shovel Knight.

Bosses
Throughout the Super Smash Bros. series, most single-player modes have included several non-playable boss characters. Some of these bosses were created specifically for the Super Smash Bros. franchise.

Master Hand is a glove-like being that appears in all games to date, serving as the final boss of Classic Mode and, in Super Smash Bros. Melee, the 50th Event Match "Final Destination Match". In Melee, Master Hand is playable via a system glitch. He is also playable in Ultimate Adventure Mode if certain requirements are met. Super Smash Bros. Melee introduced a left-hand counterpart to Master Hand named Crazy Hand, which appears alongside him in all subsequent games under certain conditions. Super Smash Bros. for Nintendo 3DS and Wii U features a new form, Master Core, a shapeshifting mass of black particles that emerge from Master Hand and Crazy Hand after their defeat. Master Hand and Crazy Hand have gone on to make cameo appearances outside of the Super Smash Bros. series, including in Kirby & the Amazing Mirror and Kirby's Dream Buffet.

Super Smash Bros. Melee introduced Giga Bowser, a larger and more monstrous version of Bowser that could be fought in the 51st Event Match, "The Showdown", and as a secret final opponent in the game's Adventure Mode under certain conditions. Giga Bowser uses the same abilities as Bowser, but is much stronger and has additional effects on his attacks, such as explosions and elemental damage. Giga Bowser later became Bowser's Final Smash in all subsequent games beginning with Super Smash Bros. Brawl, with players able to control him for the duration of the Final Smash.

Tabuu is the true villain of Super Smash Bros. Brawl story mode, The Subspace Emissary. He is a humanoid apparition composed of pure energy, with a single eye-shaped object located where a person's stomach would be. He can conjure several weapons for use in battle, including a rapier and large chakram; change his size at will, and teleport. Towards the end of The Subspace Emissary, it is revealed that Tabuu is the entity that controlled Master Hand and the true antagonist behind the events of the story.

The Subspace Emissary also features other boss characters, like Petey Piranha, Ridley, Meta Ridley, Porky, and Rayquaza. Ridley eventually became playable in Super Smash Bros. Ultimate, with Meta Ridley as an alternate costume for him, while Petey Piranha became DLC character Piranha Plant's Final Smash. Three original bosses are also featured: Tabuu, the giant cyborg Galleom, and the twin-bodied robot Duon.

Super Smash Bros. Ultimate introduces Galeem, a seraphic menace who serves as the main villain of World of Light. Known as the "lord of light" and "the ultimate enemy", Galeem destroys the Smash Bros. world, robs all the fighters except Kirby of their physical forms, and plans on creating a new world to the point of creating an army of puppet fighters powered by enslaved spirits. Galeem is opposed by Dharkon, a one-eyed creature with many tentacles. Described as the "embodiment of chaos and darkness", Dharkon seeks to defeat Galeem and consume the world in darkness. Galeem and Dharkon are aided by a swarm of Master Hand and Crazy Hand puppets respectively. The mode also features bosses Giga Bowser, Galleom, Ganon, Marx, Rathalos, and Dracula, who also appear as final opponents for different characters in the game's Classic Mode.

Other boss characters from represented franchises may appear as hazards on certain stages and attack the fighters in the middle of a battle, such as the Yellow Devil from Mega Man and Metal Face from Xenoblade Chronicles.

Other
In each of the games, there is a group of generic enemy characters based on other fighters fought in large groups in the games' single-player campaigns and "Multi-Man Smash" minigames. In the English localized versions of the games, they are given names that describe their physical form. These include the Fighting Polygon Team in the original game, the Fighting Wire Frames in Melee, the Fighting Alloy Team in Brawl and the Fighting Mii Team in for Nintendo 3DS/Wii U and Ultimate. Along with Melee Adventure Mode came the inclusion of minor, generic enemies, such as Goombas from the Super Mario series and Octoroks from The Legend of Zelda series. This trend continues into Super Smash Bros. Brawl, which also includes an assortment of original characters to serve as non-playable generic enemies led by the Subspace Army. Many generic enemies from various games appear as part of the "Smash Run" mode in Super Smash Bros. for Nintendo 3DS.

The Subspace Army are the antagonists of Super Smash Bros. Brawl, appearing in The Subspace Emissary and led by the Ancient Minister. Their goal is to pull the entire world into Subspace piece by piece using devices called Subspace Bombs. The Sandbag appears in every game's "Home-Run Contest" minigame beginning with Super Smash Bros. Melee. The object is to do as much damage as possible to Sandbag in ten seconds, then strike it with either a Home-Run Bat or a fighting move to launch it as far as possible to get the best distance. Sandbag also appears randomly as an item that drops other items when hit in various other modes in all games from Brawl onward.

Each installment has an in-game announcer who calls out the fighters' names before and after matches, as well as other gameplay elements. The announcer's voice is also used in many of the promotional materials for the games. The role has been taken on by Jeff Manning in the original game, Dean Harrington in Melee, Pat Cashman in Brawl, and Xander Mobus in Ultimate and the Nintendo 3DS und Wii U version. The announcer's voice actor traditionally voices Master Hand and Crazy Hand as well. Other characters appear in non-interactive forms that do not affect gameplay, such as collectible trophies depicting their likeness or as spectators watching a battle on specific stages.

References

External links

 
Super Smash Bros.
Nintendo protagonists
Super Smash Bros. lists
 
Lists of video game characters